The Curtatone class were a group of destroyers built for the Royal Italian Navy.

They were the first destroyers to be built in Italy after the end of World War I, and were the first ships of this type to use twin rather than single mountings.

The ships were originally ordered at the same time as the Palestro-class destroyers, but were postponed due to steel shortages.

The ships were later modernized for escort duties with the twin guns being replaced by singles and the triple  torpedo tubes replaced by twin  torpedo tubes. Extra light anti-aircraft guns were also fitted and the /40 caliber guns removed.

Ships

All four ships were built by Orlando yard in Livorno.

References

Bibliography

External links
 Curtatone Marina Militare website

 
Destroyer classes
Destroyers of the Regia Marina